Francis J. Montgomery was a Northern Irish footballer who played as a right back.

Career
Born in Coleraine, Montgomery played for Coleraine Villa and Coleraine. He also earned one cap for the Northern Ireland national team.

References

Year of birth missing
Date of death missing
Association footballers from Northern Ireland
Northern Ireland international footballers
Coleraine F.C. players
NIFL Premiership players
Association football fullbacks
Northern Ireland amateur international footballers